NOJ, or variation, may refer to:

 Noj, Iran; a village
 Noj LTD, the maker of the Dubrovnik chess set
 Night of Joy (disambiguation), multiple subjects
 Noyabrsk Airport (IATA airport code: NOJ; ICAO airport code: USRO), Yamalo-Nenets Autonomous Okrug, Russia; near Noyabrsk 
 Nonuya language (ISO 639 language code: noj)
 People's Youth of Yugoslavia (NOJ), a predecessor to the League of Communist Youth of Yugoslavia
 New Orleans Jazz, NBA basketball team now the Utah Jazz

See also

 
 
 
 NJO (disambiguation)
 JNO
 Jon (disambiguation)
 ONJ (disambiguation)
 OJN